Toxopneustes elegans is a species of sea urchin endemic to Japan. Like the closely related flower urchin, they are venomous.

Taxonomy
Toxopneustes elegans is one of the four species in the genus Toxopneustes. It was first described by the German zoologist Ludwig Heinrich Philipp Döderlein in 1885. The generic name Toxopneustes literally means "poison breath", derived from Greek τοξικόν [φάρμακον] (toksikón [phármakon], "arrow [poison]") and πνευστος (pneustos, "breath"). The specific name elegans means "elegant" in Latin.

It has no English common name, but it is known as kurosuji-rappa-uni (クロスジラッパウニ) in Japanese (literally "black streaked flower urchin").

Description

Toxopneustes elegans resemble the more common flower urchins, but they are smaller, reaching a maximum diameter of only . They also have smaller pedicellariae, though they are still characteristically flower-like in appearance. The most distinctive feature of the species, however, are the prominent black bands just below the tip of each of the short spines.

Distribution
Toxopneustes elegans is endemic to Japan. They can be found from Sagami Bay in Honshu to the waters around the Amami Islands and Okinawa.

Venom

Like other members of the genus, Toxopneustes elegans is venomous. The flower-like pedicellariae can deliver a painful sting if touched.

See also
Fire urchins

References 

Toxopneustidae
Fauna of the Pacific Ocean
Endemic fauna of Japan
Animals described in 1885
Taxa named by Ludwig Heinrich Philipp Döderlein